Nicolia is a genus of fossilized wood from the Late Cretaceous (Santonian-Campanian) of Belgium and Egypt. At one time, specimens were misidentified as a jaw fragments of a hadrosaur and named Aachenosaurus.

Taxonomy
The genus and sole species Nicolia aegyptiaca were named in 1842 by Unger. Independently in 1887, the name Aachenosaurus was created by the scientist (and abbé) Gerard Smets based on fossilized fragments of material that he thought were jaw fragments from a duck-billed dinosaur (a hadrosaur). However, the fossils turned out to be petrified wood, to the great embarrassment of the discoverer. The name Aachenosaurus means "Aachen lizard", named for the Aachen Formation of Moresnet (which was a neutral territory between Belgium and Germany), where the fossils were found. Smets considered that the specimen was a hadrosaur reaching an estimated 4 to 5 meters in length which might have had dermal spines. He defended this conclusion, citing that the fossils had been examined visually with the naked eye, magnifying lenses and with the microscope. However, his error was soon demonstrated by Louis Dollo. Smets at first tried to defend his original identification but was again proven wrong by a neutral commission. A rumor abounded that he completely withdrew from science out of pure embarrassment, but not until he had published a paper on turtles in 1889; this rumor was later proven false. The last paper he published was in 1895. Aachenosaurus is considered to be a synonym of the earlier published name Nicolia.

A synonym of Aachenosaurus is Aachenoxylon, which was coined by Dr Maurice Hovelacque in 1889/1890.

References

External links
uBio listing
Nomenclator Zoologicus listing

Late Cretaceous plants
Mesozoic trees
Fossil taxa described in 1842